Cristian Schmidt (born 13 August 1982 in Buenos Aires, Argentina) is an Argentine judoka. He competed at the 2012 Summer Olympics in the -100 kg event.

Notable results in individual events in Schmidt's career include the bronze medals at the 2011 Pan Am Games and at the 2010 South American Games.

References

External links
 
 

1982 births
Living people
Argentine male judoka
Olympic judoka of Argentina
Judoka at the 2012 Summer Olympics
Sportspeople from Buenos Aires
Pan American Games bronze medalists for Argentina
Pan American Games medalists in judo
Judoka at the 2015 Pan American Games
South American Games bronze medalists for Argentina
South American Games medalists in judo
Competitors at the 2010 South American Games
Medalists at the 2011 Pan American Games
20th-century Argentine people
21st-century Argentine people